Ornithodes is a genus of hairy-eyed craneflies (family Pediciidae). Both known species are from North America:
Ornithodes brevirostris Alexander, 1955
Ornithodes harrimani Coquillett, 1900

References

 

Pediciidae
Tipuloidea genera
Diptera of North America
Taxa named by Daniel William Coquillett